Corunna is a town in Richland Township, DeKalb County, Indiana, United States. The population was 251 at the 2010 census.

History
A post office was established at Corunna in 1858. The town was most likely named after Corunna, Michigan.

In 1914, Corunna had three schools, a bank, two mills, and a hotel.

Geography
Corunna is located at  (41.436722, -85.146189).

Demographics

2010 census
As of the census of 2010, there were 254 people, 88 households, and 64 families living in the town. The racial makeup of the town was 94.9% White, 0.4% African American, 0.4% Native American, 0.4% Asian, 2.4% from other races, and 1.6% from two or more races. Hispanic or Latino of any race were 4.3% of the population.

There were 88 households, of which 42.0% had children under the age of 18 living with them, 48.9% were married couples living together, 12.5% had a female householder with no husband present, 11.4% had a male householder with no wife present, and 27.3% were non-families. 21.6% of all households were made up of individuals, and 3.4% had someone living alone who was 65 years of age or older. The average household size was 2.89 and the average family size was 3.36.

The median age in the town was 34.3 years. 29.5% of residents were under the age of 18; 6.6% were between the ages of 18 and 24; 28.4% were from 25 to 44; 25.1% were from 45 to 64; and 10.2% were 65 years of age or older. The gender makeup of the town was 49.2% male and 50.8% female.

2000 census
As of the census of 2000, there were 254 people, 85 households, and 64 families living in the town. The racial makeup of the town was 96.06% White, 0.79% Native American, 3.15% from other races. Hispanic or Latino of any race were 4.33% of the population.

There were 85 households, out of which 29.4% had children under the age of 18 living with them, 60.0% were married couples living together, 8.2% had a female householder with no husband present, and 24.7% were non-families. 16.5% of all households were made up of individuals, and 7.1% had someone living alone who was 65 years of age or older. The average household size was 2.99 and the average family size was 3.47.

In the town, the population was spread out, with 27.6% under the age of 18, 9.4% from 18 to 24, 28.3% from 25 to 44, 27.2% from 45 to 64, and 7.5% who were 65 years of age or older. The median age was 35 years. For every 100 females, there were 104.8 males. For every 100 females age 18 and over, there were 104.4 males.

The median income for a household in the town was $40,625, and the median income for a family was $49,688. Males had a median income of $37,708 versus $22,031 for females. The per capita income for the town was $19,301. None of the families and 4.8% of the population were living below the poverty line.

Government

The Corunna Town Hall is located at 102 N Bridge St.. This building is also the former home to the Corunna Volunteer Fire Department  The Corunna Volunteer Fire Department dedicated a new building on October 28, 2006, which is located at 1111 U.S. 6.

References

Towns in DeKalb County, Indiana
Towns in Indiana
1858 establishments in Indiana
Populated places established in 1858